Trevor v Whitworth (1887) 12 App Cas 409 is a UK company law case concerning share buybacks. It held they were unlawful. The case is often used in support for the Capital Maintenance Rule.
The rule coming from the case itself has since been reformed by statute in several commonwealth countries. In the UK, the rule was reformed in 1980 and replaced with a statutory procedure so that shares can either be classed as redeemable or be bought back, under the Companies Act 2006 sections 684-723. In Australia, share buybacks are allowed under ss 257A-257J of the Corporations Act 2001.

Facts
A company bought back almost a quarter of its own shares. During liquidation of the company, one shareholder applied to court for the balance of amounts owed to him after the buyback.

The Court of Appeal held that he should be paid.

Judgment
The House of Lords held the buyback was ultra vires the company. Lord Herschell said the following,

Lord Macnaghten also gave an opinion.

See also

UK company law

Notes

References

United Kingdom company case law
House of Lords cases
1887 in case law
1887 in British law